John S. Rockwell is known as the "father of Oconomowoc."  He is responsible for building many of the city's original foundations: a grist mill, the first store, hotel, fire department, elementary school, and library. Rockwell also donated land for the community's churches. In January 1856, John and his brother D. Henry were among the trustees who obtained a state charter for the Oconomowoc Seminary, an Episcopalian female seminary for the Diocese of Wisconsin; the Oconomowoc Seminary was later called Bord du Lac.

In many of these enterprises, he worked with his youngest brother, D. Henry Rockwell (who served in the Wisconsin State Assembly); John was the eldest. In 1859, their parents celebrated their 50th wedding anniversary at their home in Elkhorn, Wisconsin; at that time, John was described as the eldest child, and D. Henry as the youngest (and unmarried).

References

People from Oconomowoc, Wisconsin